A macuahuitl is a weapon, a wooden club with several embedded obsidian blades. The name is derived from the Nahuatl language and means "hand-wood". Its sides are embedded with prismatic blades traditionally made from obsidian. Obsidian is capable of producing an edge sharper than high quality steel razor blades. The macuahuitl was a standard close combat weapon.

Use of the macuahuitl as a weapon is attested from the first millennium CE. By the time of the Spanish conquest the macuahuitl was widely distributed in Mesoamerica. The weapon was used by different civilisations including the Aztec (Mexicas), Maya, Mixtec and Toltec.

One example of this weapon survived the Conquest of the Aztec Empire; it was part of the Royal Armoury of Madrid until it was destroyed by a fire in 1884. Images of the original designs survive in diverse catalogues. The oldest replica is the macuahuitl created by the medievalist Achille Jubinal in the 19th century.

Description 

It was noted during the 16th-century Spanish conquest of the region. Other military equipment recorded includes the round shield, the bow, and the spear-thrower. Its sides are embedded with prismatic blades traditionally made from obsidian (volcanic glass); obsidian is capable of producing an edge sharper than high-quality steel razor blades.

It was capable of inflicting serious lacerations from the rows of obsidian blades embedded in its sides. These could be knapped into blades or spikes, or into a circular design that looked like scales. The macuahuitl is not specifically a sword or a club, although it approximates a European broadsword. Historian Marco John Percival Polo defines the weapon as a "kind of a saw sword".
  

According to conquistador , the macuahuitl was 0.91 to 1.22 m long, and 75 mm wide, with a groove along either edge, into which sharp-edged pieces of flint or obsidian were inserted and firmly fixed with an adhesive. Based on his research, historian John Pohl indicates that the length was just over a meter, although other models were larger, and intended for use with both hands.  

According to the research of historian Marco Cervera Obregón, the sharp pieces of obsidian, each about 3 cm long, were attached to the flat paddle with a natural adhesive, bitumen.

The rows of obsidian blades were sometimes discontinuous, leaving gaps along the side, while at other times the rows were set close together and formed a single edge. It was noted by the Spanish that the macuahuitl was so cleverly constructed that the blades could be neither pulled out nor broken. The macuahuitl was made with either a one-handed or two-handed grip, as well as in rectangular, ovoid, or pointed forms. Two-handed macuahuitl have been described as being "as tall as a man".

Typology 

Specimens 
According to Ross Hassig, the last authentic macuahuitl was destroyed in 1884 in a fire in the Real Armería in Madrid, where it was housed beside the last tepoztopilli. According to Marco Cervera Obregón, there is supposed to be at least one macuahuitl in a Museo Nacional de Antropología warehouse, but it is possibly lost.

No actual maquahuitl specimens remain and the present knowledge of them comes from contemporaneous accounts and illustrations that date to the 16th century and earlier.

Origins and distribution 

The maquahuitl predates the Aztecs. Tools made from obsidian fragments were used by some of the earliest Mesoamericans. Obsidian used in ceramic vessels has been found at Aztec sites. Obsidian cutting knives, sickles, scrapers, drills, razors, and arrow points have also been found. Several obsidian mines were close to the Aztec civilizations in the Valley of Mexico as well as in the mountains north of the valley. Among these were the Sierra de las Navajas (Razor Mountains), named after their obsidian deposits. Use of the macuahuitl as a weapon is attested from the 1st millenniaCE. A Mayan carving at Chichen Itza shows a warrior holding a macuahuitl, depicted as a club having separate blades sticking out from each side. In a mural, a warrior holds a club with many blades on one side and one sharp point on the other, also a possible variant of the macuahuitl.

By the time of the Spanish conquest, the macuahuitl was widely distributed in Mesoamerica, with records of its use by the Aztecs, Mixtecs, Tarascans, Toltecs and others. It was also commonly used by the Indian auxiliaries of Spain, though they favored Spanish swords. As Mesoamericans in Spanish service needed a special permission to carry European arms, metal swords brought Indian auxiliaries more prestige than maquahuitls in the eyes of Europeans as well as natives.

Effectiveness 

 The macuahuitl was sharp enough to decapitate a man. According to an account by Bernal Díaz del Castillo, one of Hernán Cortés’s conquistadors, it could even decapitate a horse:

Another account by a companion of Cortés known as The Anonymous Conqueror tells a similar story of its effectiveness:

Another account by Francisco de Aguilar reads:

Given the importance of human sacrifice in Nahua cultures, their warfare styles, particularly those of the Aztec and Maya, placed a premium on the capture of enemy warriors for live sacrifice. Advancement into the elite cuāuhocēlōtl warrior societies of the Aztec, for example, required taking 20 live captives from the battlefield. The macuahuitl thus shows several features designed to make it a useful tool for capturing prisoners: fitting spaced instead of contiguous blades, as seen in many codex illustrations, would intentionally limit the wound depth from a single blow, and the heavy wooden construction allows weakened opponents to be easily clubbed unconscious with the flat side of the weapon. The art of disabling opponents using an un-bladed macuahuitl as a sparring club was taught from a young age in the Aztec Tēlpochcalli schools.

The macuahuitl had many drawbacks in combat versus European steel swords. Despite being sharper, prismatic obsidian is also considerably more brittle than steel; obsidian blades of the type used on the macuahuitl tended to shatter on impact with other obsidian blades, steel swords or plate armour. Obsidian blades also have difficulty penetrating European mail. The thin, replaceable blades used on the macuahuitl were easily dulled or chipped by repeated impacts on bone or wood, making artful use of the weapon critical. It takes more time to lift and swing a club than it does to thrust with a sword. More space is needed as well, so warriors advanced in loose formations and fought in single combat.

Experimental archaeology 
Replicas of the macuahuitl have been produced and tested against sides of beef for documentary shows on the History and Discovery channels, to demonstrate the effectiveness of this weapon. On the History show Warriors, special forces operator and martial artist Terry Schappert injured himself while fencing with a macuahuitl; he cut the back of his left leg as the result of a back-swing motion.

For SpikeTV's reality program Deadliest Warrior a replica was created and tested against a model of a horse's head created using a horse's skeleton and ballistics gel. Actor and martial artist Éder Saúl López was able to decapitate the model, but it took three swings. Blows from the replica macuahuitl were most effective when it was swung and then dragged backwards upon impact, creating a sawing motion. This led Max Geiger, the computer programmer of the series, to refer to the weapon as "the obsidian chainsaw". This may have been due to the unrefined obsidian cutting edges of the weapon used in the show, compared with more finely made prismatic obsidian blades, as in the Madrid specimen.

See also 

 Macana
 Aztec warfare
 Maya warfare
 Obsidian use in Mesoamerica
 Zhanmadao
 Leiomano

References

Footnotes

Sources 

 
 
 
 
 
 
 
 
 
 
 
  
 
 
 
 
 16.Francisco de Auguilar, untitled account, in The Conquistadors, 139–140, 155.

External links 
 Glimmerdream: obsidian history
 FAMSI: John Pohl's Mesoamerica, Aztec Society/Warfare

Melee weapons
Aztec warfare
Mesoamerican military equipment
Obsidian